Claire Louise Langhamer, FRHistS, is a social and cultural historian of modern Britain. Since 2021, she has been the director of the Institute of Historical Research.

Career 

After growing up in North Humberside, she attended the University of Manchester, graduating with a history degree in 1991. She subsequently completed her doctorate under the supervision of Dave Russell at the University of Central Lancashire; she was awarded her PhD in 1996 for her thesis Women and leisure in Manchester, 1920–c.1960. In 1998, Langhamer started working as an academic at the University of Sussex as a lecturer; she was promoted to a senior lectureship in 2004 and was appointed Professor of Modern British History in 2014. She left Sussex in 2021 to be director of the Institute of Historical Research. As of 2017, she is a Fellow of the Royal Historical Society (FRHistS).

Langhamer's work has focused on the history of emotion, love, leisure and work in twentieth-century Britain, often in relation to the experiences of women. Alongside more than a dozen articles in peer-reviewed journals, Langhamer has published two single authored books, Women's Leisure in England, 1920–1960 (Manchester University Press, 2000) and  The English in Love: The Intimate Story of an Emotional Revolution (Oxford University Press, 2013).

On 1 October 2021, Langhamer became director of the Institute of Historical Research of the University of London.

Bibliography 
Books

Thesis

Peer-reviewed articles and chapters

Reviews of published works 
The English in Love (2013)
  Sally Holloway for Reviews in History (Institute of Historical Research, January 2014).
 Alexander Harris for The Guardian, 9 August 2013.
 The Economist, 17 August 2013 (vol. 408, no. 8849, p. 70).
 Karen Shook and Hilary Hinds for The Times Higher Education Supplement, 8 August 2015 (no. 2113, p. 44).
 Richard Davenport-Hines for New Statesman, 16 August 2013 (vol. 142, no. 5171, p. 38).
 Adrian Bingham for Contemporary British History, vol. 29, no. 2 (2015), pp. 284–285. 
 Susan J. Matt for Journal of Interdisciplinary History, vol. 45, no. 2 (2014), pp. 227–229.
 Susan Quilliam for Journal of Family Planning and Reproductive Health Care, vol. 40 (2014), p. 149.

Women's Leisure in England, 1920–1960 (2000)
 Grace Lees-Maffei for Journal of Design History, vol. 14, no. 2 (2001), pp. 162–164.
 Sean O'Connell for Journal of Contemporary History, vol. 37, no. 4 (2002), pp. 675–683.

References 

Year of birth missing (living people)
Living people
Social historians
Cultural historians
British women historians
Alumni of the University of Manchester
Alumni of the University of Central Lancashire
Academics of the University of Sussex
Fellows of the Royal Historical Society
English historians
People from the East Riding of Yorkshire